Raccordo autostradale 10 (RA 10) is a motorway (with dual carriageway with two lanes for the direction of travel without an emergency lane with central traffic divider of the "New Jersey" type and side parking areas) that connects the city of Turin with its international airport located in Caselle Torinese 11 km north of the capital of Piedmont.

References

RA10
Transport in Piedmont